Hudi Bitek is a village on the outskirts of Zagreb, Croatia. It is administratively located in the Brezovica city district. The population is 331. Hudi Bitek has been an inhabited settlement since the medieval times.

References 

Populated places in the City of Zagreb